Zelandomyia is a genus of crane flies in the family Limoniidae.

Distribution
New Zealand & Chile.

Species
Z. angusta (Alexander, 1923)
Z. armigera (Alexander, 1945)
Z. atridorsum Alexander, 1932
Z. cinereipleura (Alexander, 1922)
Z. deviata (Alexander, 1922)
Z. otagensis (Alexander, 1923)
Z. pallidula Alexander, 1924
Z. penthoptera Alexander, 1924
Z. pygmaea Alexander, 1923
Z. ruapehuensis (Alexander, 1922)
Z. tantula Alexander, 1926
Z. watti (Alexander, 1922)

References

Catalogue of the Craneflies of the World

Limoniidae
Tipulomorpha genera
Diptera of South America
Diptera of Australasia